Daxatina is a fossil ammonoid cephalopod included in the trachyceratid family of the order Ceratitida that lived during the middle of the Triassic.

Distribution
Triassic of Canada, Italy, Svalbard, Jan Mayen and Alaska

References
Notes

Fossils of Italy
Triassic ammonites
Fossils of Svalbard
Fossils of Canada
Ladinian genera
Trachyceratidae
Ceratitida genera